Church of the Resurrection is a Russian Orthodox Church in Kostroma, Russia near the Volga River.

History
The church was built in the middle of the 17th century, no later than 1652. According to legend, the first church "at the bottom of Debre" (the street where the church is located was staged by the Prince of Kostroma, Knyaz Vasily Yaroslavich (1248-1276).

The architects who planned the church arrived from Yaroslavl and Veliky Ustyug. The church was painted shortly after the construction in 1650–1652 years. Presumably, paintings made by masters Arteli Vasili Zapokrovsky and frescos of the chape is believed to Gur Nikitin and his team of artists.

In the 1740s the church windows were painted, gallery openings laid and the west porch connected by a covered walkway to the holy gates.

Initially, when the church was built it had a bell tower. But in 1801, when the restructuring of the neighboring "warm" Znamensky temple, constituting a single complex of the Resurrection Church, the bell tower was demolished and in its place built a new one, adjacent to the Church of the Sign.

In Soviet times, the church operated until 1930. Then it was closed, and its walls made a granary, and in the basement there was a military warehouse. In 1946 the church was re-opened. According to the memoirs of contemporaries, the church had no floors and icons and windows were broken.

Over a quarter of a century (since 1964) a small church served as a cathedral of the diocese of Kostroma. Here, until 1991 remained one of the most revered shrines Kostroma - Feodorovskaya Icon of the Mother of God from the ruins in 1934, the Assumption Cathedral. In the years 1967-1969 restoration works were carried out.

External links
 Official website of Znamensky Monastery

Buildings and structures in Kostroma Oblast
Kostroma
Churches in Kostroma Oblast
1645 establishments in Russia
Churches completed in 1651